Twilight Theater, also known as Steve Martin's Twilight Theater, is a 1982 American comedy show created by Steve Martin.

References

External links
 Twilight Theater on IMDb

1982 American television series debuts
1982 American television series endings 
English-language television shows